Henry Butler (September 21, 1948 – July 2, 2018) was an American jazz and blues pianist. He learned piano, drums, and saxophone in school. He received a college degree and graduate degree and taught at the New Orleans Center for Creative Arts. He worked as a soloist and in groups in Los Angeles and New York City. Despite his blindness, he spent time as a photographer and had his work exhibited in galleries.

Biography

Butler was born in New Orleans, and was blinded by glaucoma in infancy. His musical training began at the Louisiana State School for the Blind, where he learned to play valve trombone, baritone horn, and drums before concentrating on singing and piano.

Butler was mentored at Southern University in Baton Rouge, Louisiana, by clarinetist and educator Alvin Batiste. Butler later earned a master's degree in music at Michigan State University in 1974 and received the MSU Distinguished Alumni Award in 2009.

He taught at Eastern Illinois University from 1990 to 1996, after which he returned to New Orleans. In 1993, he founded a series of jazz camps for blind and visually impaired young musicians, which were featured in a 2010 documentary titled The Music's Gonna Get You Through.

In August 2005, Hurricane Katrina devastated Butler's home in the Gentilly section of New Orleans. His 1925 vintage Mason & Hamlin piano was wrecked by flood waters that rose to nearly eight feet inside his house.

In the wake of Katrina's damage, Butler left New Orleans and moved to Boulder, Colorado, then Denver. He spoke of the Colorado period as "a trying exile". In 2009, Butler moved to New York City.

Beginning in 1984, Butler pursued photography as a hobby after attending art exhibits in Los Angeles and asking friends to describe what they saw. His methods and photos were featured in the HBO2 documentary Dark Light: The Art of Blind Photographers that aired in 2010. Butler's photographs were shown in galleries in New Orleans.

Butler died of cancer in New York City on July 2, 2018, at the age of 69.

Praise
Butler was known for his technique and his ability to play in many styles of music. In 1987, music critic Jon Pareles of The New York Times wrote that Butler "revels in fluency and facility, splashing chords all over the keyboard and streaking through solos with machine-gun articulation". In 1998, critic Howard Reich of the Chicago Tribune described Butler as "an enormous intellect matched by unusual physical strength".

Discography

As leader
 Fivin' Around (MCA, 1986)
 The Village (MCA, 1987)
 Orleans Inspiration (Windham Hill, 1990)
 Blues & More (Windham Hill, 1992)
 For All Seasons (Atlantic, 1996)
 Blues After Sunset (Black Top, 1998)
 Vu-Du Menz with Corey Harris (Alligator, 2000)
 The Game Has Just Begun (Basin Street, 2002)
 Homeland (Basin Street, 2004)
 Pianola Live (Basin Street, 2008)
 Viper's Drag with Steven Bernstein (Impulse!, 2014)

References

External links

 Official website
 Culture Catch Music Salon & Dusty Wright interview 
 Le Show interview: 

1948 births
2018 deaths
African-American pianists
American jazz pianists
American male pianists
American photographers
American rhythm and blues musicians
Blind musicians
Jazz musicians from New Orleans
Black Top Records artists
Windham Hill Records artists
MCA Records artists
Atlantic Records artists
20th-century American pianists
Deaths from cancer in New York (state)
Impulse! Records artists
20th-century American male musicians
American male jazz musicians
20th-century African-American musicians
21st-century African-American people
Southern University alumni
Michigan State University alumni
Eastern Illinois University faculty
American blind people